Domenico Sandrini (born Cercino, February 8, 1883 – died Cercino, September 29, 1973) was an early Italian cross-country skier, Nordic combined skier, and ski jumper. He was a member of the Sci Club Ponte di Legno.

Notable results 
 1914:
 1st, Italian championships of ski jumping
 1st, Italian championships of Nordic combined skiing
 2nd, Italian men's championships of cross-country skiing, 18 km

References 

1883 births
1973 deaths
Italian male ski jumpers
Italian male cross-country skiers
Italian male Nordic combined skiers
Sportspeople from the Province of Sondrio